The Lady McLeod was a paddle steamer and a private local post. The ship sailed regularly between Port of Spain and San Fernando, on Trinidad island, now in Trinidad and Tobago from the end of 1845 until 1854. The private local post ran during the same time with the use of postage stamps on its mail from April 1847.

History 
Coming from the Napier shipyard in Glasgow, the ship was christened in hommage of the Governor Sir Henry McLeod's wife and began its Port of Spain–San Fernando route in November 1845.

The 60-ton, 40 hp, steamer was bought by Turnbull, Stewart & Co. In 1846, David Bryce bought it and let it some years later to a San Fernando consortium.

At the beginning of the 1850s, the postal monopoly ended and American and Netherlands ships entered the competition. After a last purchase, the ship foundered near San Fernando in 1854. The Lady McLeod'''s bell was retrieved and has been regularly displayed by the Trinidad Philatelic Society.

 Postage stamp 
The private local post of the Lady McLeod began as soon as its service started in November 1845. There were two rates: a monthly subscription of one dollar, or ten cents per letter.

In April 1847, Bryce decided to introduce stamps that were sold individually for 5 cents, or for 4 cents if bought by the hundred. The Lady McLeod only transported letters bearing stamps, or pre-paid mail of the subscribers. The imperforate stamp's illustration was a white ship on a blue background, with the initials "LMc L" printed underneath. Lithographically printed, the stamp was cancelled by a cross drawn by hand or by ripping up a corner.

In 1851, the British colony issued its own stamps figuring a sitting Britannia.

See also
 Postage stamps and postal history of Trinidad and Tobago

 References 

Bibliography
 Courtney, Nicholas (2004). The Queen's Stamps. The Authorised History of the Royal Philatelic Collection. Methuen, pages 48–50. The story inspired by a letter dated 2 June 1847, with a non cancelled Lady McLeod stamp, that the Duke of York, later King George V, acquired around the 1890s.
 Mackay, James. "Her ladyship's ship". Stamp Magazine'' #73-10: October 2007, page 59.

Paddle steamers
Victorian-era ships
History of Trinidad and Tobago
Postage stamps
Ships built on the River Clyde
Philately of Trinidad and Tobago